Lockston is a settlement located near Trinity, Newfoundland and Labrador. It may, these days, perhaps be better considered as an 'area' with a sizable amount of summer cabins and a small permanent population.

See also
 List of communities in Newfoundland and Labrador

Populated places in Newfoundland and Labrador